Leo Strauss (September 20, 1899 – October 18, 1973) was a German-American scholar of political philosophy who specialized in classical political philosophy. Born in Germany to Jewish parents, Strauss later emigrated from Germany to the United States. He spent much of his career as a professor of political science at the University of Chicago, where he taught several generations of students and published fifteen books.

Trained in the neo-Kantian tradition with Ernst Cassirer and immersed in the work of the phenomenologists Edmund Husserl and Martin Heidegger, Strauss established his fame with path-breaking books on Spinoza and Hobbes, then with articles on Maimonides and Al-Farabi. In the late 1930s his research focused on the rediscovery of esoteric writing, thereby a new illumination of Plato and Aristotle, retracing their interpretation through medieval Islamic and Jewish philosophy, and encouraging the application of those ideas to contemporary political theory.

Biography

Early life and education
Strauss was born on September 20, 1899, in the small town of Kirchhain in Hesse-Nassau, a province of the Kingdom of Prussia (part of the German Empire), to Hugo Strauss and Jennie Strauss, née David. According to Allan Bloom's 1974 obituary in Political Theory, Strauss "was raised as an Orthodox Jew", but the family does not appear to have completely embraced Orthodox practice. Strauss himself noted that he came from a "conservative, even orthodox Jewish home", but one which knew little about Judaism except strict adherence to ceremonial laws. His father and uncle operated a farm supply and livestock business that they inherited from their father, Meyer (1835–1919), a leading member of the local Jewish community.

After attending the Kirchhain Volksschule and the Protestant Rektoratsschule, Leo Strauss was enrolled at the Gymnasium Philippinum (affiliated with the University of Marburg) in nearby Marburg (from which Johannes Althusius and Carl J. Friedrich also graduated) in 1912, graduating in 1917. He boarded with the Marburg cantor Strauss (no relation), whose residence served as a meeting place for followers of the neo-Kantian philosopher Hermann Cohen. Strauss served in the German army from World War I from July 5, 1917, to December 1918.

Strauss subsequently enrolled in the University of Hamburg, where he received his doctorate in 1921; his thesis, On the Problem of Knowledge in the Philosophical Doctrine of F. H. Jacobi (Das Erkenntnisproblem in der philosophischen Lehre Fr. H. Jacobis), was supervised by Ernst Cassirer. He also attended courses at the Universities of Freiburg and Marburg, including some taught by Edmund Husserl and Martin Heidegger. Strauss joined a Jewish fraternity and worked for the German Zionist movement, which introduced him to various German Jewish intellectuals, such as Norbert Elias, Leo Löwenthal, Hannah Arendt and Walter Benjamin. Benjamin was and remained an admirer of Strauss and his work throughout his life.

Strauss's closest friend was Jacob Klein but he also was intellectually engaged with Gerhard Krüger—and also Karl Löwith, Julius Guttman, Hans-Georg Gadamer, and Franz Rosenzweig (to whom Strauss dedicated his first book), as well as Gershom Scholem, Alexander Altmann, and the Arabist Paul Kraus, who married Strauss's sister Bettina (Strauss and his wife later adopted Paul and Bettina Kraus's child when both parents died in the Middle East). With several of these friends, Strauss carried on vigorous epistolary exchanges later in life, many of which are published in the Gesammelte Schriften (Collected Writings), some in translation from the German. Strauss had also been engaged in a discourse with Carl Schmitt. However, after Strauss left Germany, he broke off the discourse when Schmitt failed to respond to his letters.

Career 

After receiving a Rockefeller Fellowship in 1932, Strauss left his position at the Higher Institute for Jewish Studies in Berlin for Paris. He returned to Germany only once, for a few short days twenty years later. In Paris, he married Marie (Miriam) Bernsohn, a widow with a young child, whom he had known previously in Germany. He adopted his wife's son, Thomas, and later his sister's child, Jenny Strauss Clay (later a professor of classics at the University of Virginia); he and Miriam had no biological children of their own. At his death, he was survived by Thomas, Jenny Strauss Clay, and three grandchildren. Strauss became a lifelong friend of Alexandre Kojève and was on friendly terms with Raymond Aron and Étienne Gilson. Because of the Nazis' rise to power, he chose not to return to his native country. Strauss found shelter, after some vicissitudes, in England, where, in 1935 he gained temporary employment at the University of Cambridge with the help of his in-law David Daube, who was affiliated with Gonville and Caius College. While in England, he became a close friend of R. H. Tawney, and was on less friendly terms with Isaiah Berlin.

Unable to find permanent employment in England, Strauss moved in 1937 to the United States, under the patronage of Harold Laski, who made introductions and helped him obtain a brief lectureship. After a short stint as Research Fellow in the Department of History at Columbia University, Strauss secured a position at The New School, where, between 1938 and 1948, he worked in the political science faculty and also took on adjunct jobs. In 1939, he served for a short term as a visiting professor at Hamilton College. He became a U.S. citizen in 1944, and in 1949 became a professor of political science at the University of Chicago, holding the Robert Maynard Hutchins Distinguished Service Professorship until he left in 1969.

In 1953, Strauss coined the phrase reductio ad Hitlerum, a play on reductio ad absurdum, suggesting that comparing an argument to one of Hitler's, or "playing the Nazi card", is often a fallacy of irrelevance.

In 1954 he met Löwith and Gadamer in Heidelberg and delivered a public speech on Socrates. He had received a call for a temporary lectureship in Hamburg in 1965 (which he declined for health reasons) and received and accepted an honorary doctorate from Hamburg University and the Bundesverdienstkreuz (German Order of Merit) via the German representative in Chicago. In 1969 Strauss moved to Claremont McKenna College (formerly Claremont Men's College) in California for a year, and then to St. John's College, Annapolis in 1970, where he was the Scott Buchanan Distinguished Scholar in Residence until his death from pneumonia in 1973. He was buried in Annapolis Hebrew Cemetery, with his wife Miriam Bernsohn Strauss, who died in 1985. Psalm 114 was read in the funeral service at the request of family and friends.

Views

Philosophy 
For Strauss, politics and philosophy were necessarily intertwined. He regarded the trial and death of Socrates as the moment when political philosophy came into existence. Strauss considered one of the most important moments in the history of philosophy Socrates' argument that philosophers could not study nature without considering their own human nature, which, in the words of Aristotle, is that of "a political animal". However, he also held that the ends of politics and philosophy were inherently irreconcilable and irreducible to one another.

Strauss distinguished "scholars" from "great thinkers", identifying himself as a scholar. He wrote that most self-described philosophers are in actuality scholars, cautious and methodical. Great thinkers, in contrast, boldly and creatively address big problems. Scholars deal with these problems only indirectly by reasoning about the great thinkers' differences.

In Natural Right and History Strauss begins with a critique of Max Weber's epistemology, briefly engages the relativism of Martin Heidegger (who goes unnamed), and continues with a discussion of the evolution of natural rights via an analysis of the thought of Thomas Hobbes and John Locke. He concludes by critiquing Jean-Jacques Rousseau and Edmund Burke. At the heart of the book are excerpts from Plato, Aristotle, and Cicero. Much of his philosophy is a reaction to the works of Heidegger. Indeed, Strauss wrote that Heidegger's thinking must be understood and confronted before any complete formulation of modern political theory is possible, and this means that political thought has to engage with issues of ontology and the history of metaphysics.

Strauss wrote that Friedrich Nietzsche was the first philosopher to properly understand historicism, an idea grounded in a general acceptance of Hegelian philosophy of history. Heidegger, in Strauss's view, sanitized and politicized Nietzsche, whereas Nietzsche believed "our own principles, including the belief in progress, will become as unconvincing and alien as all earlier principles (essences) had shown themselves to be" and "the only way out seems to be ... that one voluntarily choose life-giving delusion instead of deadly truth, that one fabricate a myth". Heidegger believed that the tragic nihilism of Nietzsche was itself a "myth" guided by a defective Western conception of Being that Heidegger traced to Plato. In his published correspondence with Alexandre Kojève, Strauss wrote that Hegel was correct when he postulated that an end of history implies an end to philosophy as understood by classical political philosophy.

On reading 

In the late 1930s, Strauss called for the first time for a reconsideration of the "distinction between exoteric (or public) and esoteric (or secret) teaching". In 1952 he published Persecution and the Art of Writing, arguing that serious writers write esoterically, that is, with multiple or layered meanings, often disguised within irony or paradox, obscure references, even deliberate self-contradiction. Esoteric writing serves several purposes: protecting the philosopher from the retribution of the regime, and protecting the regime from the corrosion of philosophy; it attracts the right kind of reader and repels the wrong kind; and ferreting out the interior message is in itself an exercise of philosophic reasoning. Taking his bearings from his study of Maimonides and Al-Farabi, and pointing further back to Plato's discussion of writing as contained in the Phaedrus, Strauss proposed that the classical and medieval art of esoteric writing is the proper medium for philosophic learning: rather than displaying philosophers' thoughts superficially, classical and medieval philosophical texts guide their readers in thinking and learning independently of imparted knowledge. Thus, Strauss agrees with the Socrates of the Phaedrus, where the Greek indicates that, insofar as writing does not respond when questioned, good writing provokes questions in the reader—questions that orient the reader towards an understanding of problems the author thought about with utmost seriousness. Strauss thus, in Persecution and the Art of Writing, presents Maimonides "as a closet nonbeliever obfuscating his message for political reasons".

Strauss's hermeneutical argument—rearticulated throughout his subsequent writings (most notably in The City and Man [1964])—is that, before the 19th century, Western scholars commonly understood that philosophical writing is not at home in any polity, no matter how liberal. Insofar as it questions conventional wisdom at its roots, philosophy must guard itself especially against those readers who believe themselves authoritative, wise, and liberal defenders of the status quo. In questioning established opinions, or in investigating the principles of morality, philosophers of old found it necessary to convey their messages in an oblique manner. Their "art of writing" was the art of esoteric communication. This was especially apparent in medieval times when heterodox political thinkers wrote under the threat of the Inquisition or comparably obtuse tribunals.

Strauss's argument is not that the medieval writers he studies reserved one exoteric meaning for the many (hoi polloi) and an esoteric, hidden one for the few (hoi oligoi), but that, through rhetorical stratagems including self-contradiction and hyperboles, these writers succeeded in conveying their proper meaning at the tacit heart of their writings—a heart or message irreducible to "the letter" or historical dimension of texts.

Explicitly following Gotthold Ephraim Lessing's lead, Strauss indicates that medieval political philosophers, no less than their ancient counterparts, carefully adapted their wording to the dominant moral views of their time, lest their writings be condemned as heretical or unjust, not by "the many" (who did not read), but by those "few" whom the many regarded as the most righteous guardians of morality. It was precisely these righteous personalities who would be most inclined to persecute/ostracize anyone who was in the business of exposing the noble or great lie upon which the authority of the few over the many stands or falls.

According to his critics, especially Shadia Drury, Strauss wrongly assumes a distinction between an "exoteric" or salutary and an "esoteric" or "true" aspect of the philosophy of pre-modern political philosophers. Furthermore, Strauss is often accused of having himself written esoterically. The accusation would seem to rest upon the belief that in modern-era liberal societies and, especially in the United States, philosophers are not free to voice their philosophical views in public without being accused of impropriety.

On politics 

According to Strauss, modern social science is flawed because it assumes the fact–value distinction, a concept which Strauss found dubious. He traced its roots in Enlightenment philosophy to Max Weber, a thinker whom Strauss described as a "serious and noble mind". Weber wanted to separate values from science but, according to Strauss, was really a derivative thinker, deeply influenced by Nietzsche's relativism. Strauss treated politics as something that could not be studied from afar. A political scientist examining politics with a value-free scientific eye, for Strauss, was self-deluded. Positivism, the heir to both Auguste Comte and Max Weber in the quest to make purportedly value-free judgments, failed to justify its own existence, which would require a value judgment.

While modern-era liberalism had stressed the pursuit of individual liberty as its highest goal, Strauss felt that there should be a greater interest in the problem of human excellence and political virtue. Through his writings, Strauss constantly raised the question of how, and to what extent, freedom and excellence can coexist. Strauss refused to make do with any simplistic or one-sided resolutions of the Socratic question: What is the good for the city and man?

Encounters with Carl Schmitt and Alexandre Kojève 
Two significant political-philosophical dialogues Strauss had with living thinkers were those he held with Carl Schmitt and Alexandre Kojève. Schmitt, who would later become, for a short time, the chief jurist of Nazi Germany, was one of the first important German academics to review Strauss's early work positively. Schmitt's positive reference for, and approval of, Strauss's work on Hobbes was instrumental in winning Strauss the scholarship funding that allowed him to leave Germany.

Strauss's critique and clarifications of The Concept of the Political led Schmitt to make significant emendations in its second edition. Writing to Schmitt in 1932, Strauss summarised Schmitt's political theology that "because man is by nature evil, he, therefore, needs  dominion. But dominion can be established, that is, men can be unified only in a unity against—against other men. Every association of men is necessarily a separation from other men ... the political thus understood is not the constitutive principle of the state, of order, but a condition of the state."

Strauss, however, directly opposed Schmitt's position. For Strauss, Schmitt and his return to Thomas Hobbes helpfully clarified the nature of our political existence and our modern self-understanding. Schmitt's position was therefore symptomatic of the modern-era liberal self-understanding. Strauss believed that such an analysis, as in Hobbes's time, served as a useful "preparatory action", revealing our contemporary orientation towards the eternal problems of politics (social existence). However, Strauss believed that Schmitt's reification of our modern self-understanding of the problem of politics into a political theology was not an adequate solution. Strauss instead advocated a return to a broader classical understanding of human nature and a tentative return to political philosophy, in the tradition of the ancient philosophers.

With Kojève, Strauss had a close and lifelong philosophical friendship. They had first met as students in Berlin. The two thinkers shared boundless philosophical respect for each other. Kojève would later write that, without befriending Strauss, "I never would have known ... what philosophy is". The political-philosophical dispute between Kojève and Strauss centered on the role that philosophy should and can be allowed to play in politics.

Kojève, a senior civil servant in the French government, was instrumental in the creation of the European Economic Community. He argued that philosophers should have an active role in shaping political events. Strauss, on the contrary, believed that philosophers should play a role in politics only to the extent that they can ensure that philosophy, which he saw as mankind's highest activity, can be free from political intervention.

Liberalism and nihilism 
Strauss argued that liberalism in its modern form (which is oriented toward universal freedom as opposed to "ancient liberalism" which is oriented toward human excellence), contained within it an intrinsic tendency towards extreme relativism, which in turn led to two types of nihilism:

The first was a "brutal" nihilism, expressed in Nazi and Bolshevik regimes. In On Tyranny, he wrote that these ideologies, both descendants of Enlightenment thought, tried to destroy all traditions, history, ethics, and moral standards and replace them by force under which nature and mankind are subjugated and conquered. The second type—the "gentle" nihilism expressed in Western liberal democracies—was a kind of value-free aimlessness and a hedonistic "permissive egalitarianism," which he saw as permeating the fabric of contemporary American society.

In the belief that 20th-century relativism, scientism, historicism, and nihilism were all implicated in the deterioration of modern society and philosophy, Strauss sought to uncover the philosophical pathways that had led to this situation. The resultant study led him to advocate a tentative return to classical political philosophy as a starting point for judging political action.

Strauss's interpretation of Plato's Republic 
According to Strauss, The Republic by Plato is not "a blueprint for regime reform" (a play on words from Karl Popper's Open Society and Its Enemies, which attacks The Republic for being just that). Strauss quotes Cicero: "The Republic does not bring to light the best possible regime but rather the nature of political things—the nature of the city."

Strauss argued that the city-in-speech was unnatural, precisely because "it is rendered possible by the abstraction from eros". Though skeptical of "progress", Strauss was equally skeptical about political agendas of "return"—that is, going backward instead of forward.

In fact, he was consistently suspicious of anything claiming to be a solution to an old political or philosophical problem. He spoke of the danger in trying finally to resolve the debate between rationalism and traditionalism in politics. In particular, along with many in the pre-World War II German Right, he feared people trying to force a world state to come into being in the future, thinking that it would inevitably become a tyranny. Hence he kept his distance from the two totalitarianisms that he denounced in his century, both fascists and communists.

Strauss and Karl Popper 
Strauss actively rejected Karl Popper's views as illogical. He agreed with a letter of response to his request of Eric Voegelin to look into the issue. In the response, Voegelin wrote that studying Popper's views was a waste of precious time, and "an annoyance". Specifically about The Open Society and Its Enemies and Popper's understanding of Plato's The Republic, after giving some examples, Voegelin wrote:

Strauss proceeded to show this letter to Kurt Riezler, who used his influence in order to oppose Popper's appointment at the University of Chicago.

Ancients and Moderns 
Strauss constantly stressed the importance of two dichotomies in political philosophy, namely Athens and Jerusalem (reason and revelation) and Ancient versus Modern. The "Ancients" were the Socratic philosophers and their intellectual heirs; the "Moderns" start with Niccolò Machiavelli. The contrast between Ancients and Moderns was understood to be related to the unresolvable tension between Reason and Revelation. The Socratics, reacting to the first Greek philosophers, brought philosophy back to earth, and hence back to the marketplace, making it more political.

The Moderns reacted to the dominance of revelation in medieval society by promoting the possibilities of Reason. They objected to Aquinas's merger of natural right and natural theology, for it made natural right vulnerable to sideshow theological disputes. Thomas Hobbes, under the influence of Francis Bacon, re-oriented political thought to what was most solid but also most low in man—his physical hopes and fears—setting a precedent for John Locke and the later economic approach to political thought, as in David Hume and Adam Smith.

Strauss and Zionism 
As a youth, Strauss belonged to the German Zionist youth group, along with his friends Gershom Scholem and Walter Benjamin. Both were admirers of Strauss and would continue to be throughout their lives. When he was 17, as he said, he was "converted" to political Zionism as a follower of Vladimir Jabotinsky. He wrote several essays about its controversies but left these activities behind by his early twenties.

While Strauss maintained a sympathetic interest in Zionism, he later came to refer to Zionism as "problematic" and became disillusioned with some of its aims.

He taught at the Hebrew University of Jerusalem during the 1954–55 academic year. In his letter to a National Review editor, Strauss asked why Israel had been called a racist state by one of their writers. He argued that the author did not provide enough proof for his argument. He ended his essay with this statement: "Political Zionism is problematic for obvious reasons. But I can never forget what it achieved as a moral force in an era of complete dissolution. It helped to stem the tide of 'progressive' leveling of venerable, ancestral differences; it fulfilled a conservative function."

Religious belief 
Although Strauss accepted the utility of religious belief, there is some question about his religious views. He was openly disdainful of atheism and disapproved of contemporary dogmatic disbelief, which he considered intemperate and irrational. However, like Thomas Aquinas, he felt that revelation must be subject to examination by reason. At the end of The City and Man, Strauss invites us to "be open to ... the question quid sit deus ["What is God?"]" (p. 241). Edward Feser writes that "Strauss was not himself an orthodox believer, neither was he a convinced atheist. Since whether or not to accept a purported divine revelation is itself one of the 'permanent' questions, orthodoxy must always remain an option equally as defensible as unbelief."

In Natural Right and History Strauss distinguishes a Socratic (Platonic, Ciceronian, Aristotelian) from a conventionalist (materialistic, Epicurean) reading of divinity, and argues that "the question of religion" (what is religion?) is inseparable from the question of the nature of civil society and civil authority. Throughout the volume he argues for the Socratic reading of civil authority and rejects the conventionalist reading (of which atheism is an essential component). This is incompatible with interpretations by Shadia Drury and other scholars who argue that Strauss viewed religion purely instrumentally.

Reception and legacy

Reception by contemporaries 
Strauss's works were read and admired by thinkers as diverse as the philosophers Gershom Scholem, Walter Benjamin, Hans-Georg Gadamer, and Alexandre Kojève, and the psychoanalyst Jacques Lacan. Benjamin had become acquainted with Strauss as a student in Berlin, and expressed admiration for Strauss throughout his life. Gadamer stated that he 'largely agreed' with Strauss's interpretations.

Students 
Students who studied under Strauss, or attended his lecture courses at the University of Chicago, include George Anastaplo, Hadley Arkes, Seth Benardete, Laurence Berns, Allan Bloom, David Bolotin, Christopher Bruell, Charles Butterworth, Werner Dannhauser, Murray Dry, William Galston, Victor Gourevitch, Harry V. Jaffa, Roger Masters, Clifford Orwin, Thomas Pangle, Stanley Rosen, Abram Shulsky (Director of the Office of Special Plans), Susan Sontag, Warren Winiarski, and Paul Wolfowitz (who attended two lecture courses by Strauss on Plato and Montesquieu's The Spirit of the Laws at the University of Chicago). Richard Rorty described Strauss as a particular influence in his early studies at the University of Chicago, where Rorty studied a "classical curriculum" under Strauss.

The Straussian school 
Straussianism is the name given "to denote the research methods, common concepts, theoretical presuppositions, central questions, and pedagogic style (teaching style) characteristic of the large number of conservatives who have been influenced by the thought and teaching of Leo Strauss". While it "is particularly influential among university professors of historical political theory ... it also sometimes serves as a common intellectual framework more generally among conservative activists, think tank professionals, and public intellectuals". Harvey C. Mansfield, Steven B. Smith and Steven Berg, though never students of Strauss, are "Straussians" (as some followers of Strauss identify themselves). Mansfield has argued that there is no such thing as "Straussianism" yet there are Straussians and a school of Straussians. Mansfield describes the school as "open to the whole of philosophy" and without any definite doctrines that one has to believe in order to belong to it.

Within the discipline of political theory, the method calls for its practitioners to use "a 'close reading' of the 'Great Books' of political thought; they strive to understand a thinker 'as he understood himself'; they are unconcerned with questions about the historical context of, or historical influences on, a given author" and strive to be open to the idea that they may find something timelessly true in a great book. The approach "resembles in important ways the old New Criticism in literary studies". 

There is some controversy in the approach over what distinguishes a great book from lesser works. Great books are held to be written by authors/philosophers "of such sovereign critical self-knowledge and intellectual power that they can in no way be reduced to the general thought of their time and place", with other works "understood as epiphenomenal to the original insights of a thinker of the first rank". This approach is seen as a counter "to the historicist presuppositions of the mid-twentieth century, which read the history of political thought in a progressivist way, with past philosophies forever cut off from us in a superseded past". Straussianism puts forward the possibility that past thinkers may have "hold of the truthand that more recent thinkers are therefore wrong".

The Chinese Straussians 
Almost the entirety of Strauss's writings has been translated into Chinese; and there even is a school of Straussians in China, the most prominent being Liu Xiaofeng (Renmin University) and Gan Yang. "Chinese Straussians" (who often are also fascinated by Carl Schmitt) represent a remarkable example of the hybridization of Western political theory in a non-Western context. As the editors of a recent volume write, "the reception of Schmitt and Strauss in the Chinese-speaking world (and especially in the People's Republic of China) not only says much about how Schmitt and Strauss can be read today, but also provides important clues about the deeper contradictions of Western modernity and the dilemmas of non-liberal societies in our increasingly contentious world".

Criticism

Conservatism 
Some critics of Strauss have accused him of being elitist, illiberal and anti-democratic. Journalists such as Seymour Hersh have opined that Strauss endorsed noble lies, "myths used by political leaders seeking to maintain a cohesive society". In The City and Man, Strauss discusses the myths outlined in Plato's Republic that are required for all governments. These include a belief that the state's land belongs to it even though it may have been acquired illegitimately and that citizenship is rooted in something more than accidents of birth.

Shadia Drury, in Leo Strauss and the American Right (1999), claimed that Strauss inculcated an elitist strain in American political leaders linked to imperialist militarism, neoconservatism and Christian fundamentalism. Drury argues that Strauss teaches that "perpetual deception of the citizens by those in power is critical because they need to be led, and they need strong rulers to tell them what's good for them". Nicholas Xenos similarly argues that Strauss was "an anti-democrat in a fundamental sense, a true reactionary". Xenos says: "Strauss was somebody who wanted to go back to a previous, pre-liberal, pre-bourgeois era of blood and guts, of imperial domination, of authoritarian rule, of pure fascism."

Anti-historicism 
Strauss has also been criticized by some conservatives. According to Claes G. Ryn, Strauss's anti-historicist thinking creates an artificial contrast between moral universality and "the conventional", "the ancestral", and "the historical". Strauss, Ryn argues, wrongly and reductively assumes that respect for tradition must undermine reason and universality. Contrary to Strauss's criticism of Edmund Burke, the historical sense may be indispensable to an adequate apprehension of universality. Strauss's abstract, ahistorical conception of natural right distorts genuine universality, Ryn contends. Strauss does not consider the possibility that real universality becomes known to human beings in a concretized, particular form. Strauss and the Straussians have paradoxically taught philosophically unsuspecting American conservatives, not least Roman Catholic intellectuals, to reject tradition in favor of ahistorical theorizing, a bias that flies in the face of the central Christian notion of the Incarnation, which represents a synthesis of the universal and the historical. According to Ryn, the propagation of a purely abstract idea of universality has contributed to the neoconservative advocacy of allegedly universal American principles, which neoconservatives see as justification for American intervention around the world—bringing the blessings of the "West" to the benighted "rest". Strauss's anti-historical thinking connects him and his followers with the French Jacobins, who also regarded tradition as incompatible with virtue and rationality. 

What Ryn calls the "new Jacobinism" of the "neoconservative" philosophy is, writes Paul Edward Gottfried, also the rhetoric of Saint-Just and Trotsky, which the philosophically impoverished American Right has taken over with mindless alacrity; Republican operators and think tanks apparently believe they can carry the electorate by appealing to yesterday's leftist clichés.

Response to criticism 
In his 2009 book, Straussophobia, Peter Minowitz provides a detailed critique of Drury, Xenos, and other critics of Strauss whom he accuses of "bigotry and buffoonery". 

In Reading Leo Strauss, Steven B. Smith rejects the link between Strauss and neoconservative thought, arguing that Strauss was never personally active in politics, never endorsed imperialism, and questioned the utility of political philosophy for the practice of politics. In particular, Strauss argued that Plato's myth of the philosopher king should be read as a reductio ad absurdum, and that philosophers should understand politics not in order to influence policy but to ensure philosophy's autonomy from politics. In his review of Reading Leo Strauss, Robert Alter writes that Smith "persuasively sets the record straight on Strauss's political views and on what his writing is really about". 

Strauss's daughter, Jenny Strauss Clay, defended Strauss against the charge that he was the "mastermind behind the neoconservative ideologues who control United States foreign policy." "He was a conservative", she says, "insofar as he did not think change is necessarily change for the better." Since contemporary academia "leaned to the left", with its "unquestioned faith in progress and science combined with a queasiness regarding any kind of moral judgment", Strauss stood outside of the academic consensus. Had academia leaned to the right, he would have questioned it, tooand on certain occasions did question the tenets of the right.

Mark Lilla has argued that the attribution to Strauss of neoconservative views contradicts a careful reading of Strauss' actual texts, in particular On Tyranny. Lilla summarizes Strauss as follows:
Philosophy must always be aware of the dangers of tyranny, as a threat to both political decency and the philosophical life. It must understand enough about politics to defend its own autonomy, without falling into the error of thinking that philosophy can shape the political world according to its own lights.

Responding to charges that Strauss's teachings fostered the neoconservative foreign policy of the George W. Bush administration, such as "unrealistic hopes for the spread of liberal democracy through military conquest", Nathan Tarcov, director of the Leo Strauss Center at the University of Chicago, asserts that Strauss as a political philosopher was essentially non-political. After an exegesis of the very limited practical political views to be gleaned from Strauss's writings, Tarcov concludes that "Strauss can remind us of the permanent problems, but we have only ourselves to blame for our faulty solutions to the problems of today."

Bibliography 
 Books and articles
 Gesammelte Schriften. Ed. Heinrich Meier. Stuttgart: J. B. Metzler, 1996. Four vols. published to date: Vol. 1, Die Religionskritik Spinozas und zugehörige Schriften (rev. ed. 2001); vol. 2, Philosophie und Gesetz, Frühe Schriften (1997); Vol. 3, Hobbes' politische Wissenschaft und zugehörige Schrifte – Briefe (2001); Vol. 4, Politische Philosophie. Studien zum theologisch-politischen Problem (2010). The full series will also include Vol. 5, Über Tyrannis (2013) and Vol. 6, Gedanken über Machiavelli. Deutsche Erstübersetzung (2014).
 Leo Strauss: The Early Writings (1921–1932). (Trans. from parts of Gesammelte Schriften). Trans. Michael Zank. Albany: SUNY Press, 2002.
 Die Religionskritik Spinozas als Grundlage seiner Bibelwissenschaft: Untersuchungen zu Spinozas Theologisch-politischem Traktat. Berlin: Akademie-Verlag, 1930.
 Spinoza's Critique of Religion. (English trans. by Elsa M. Sinclair of Die Religionskritik Spinozas, 1930.) With a new English preface and a trans. of Strauss's 1932 German essay on Carl Schmitt. New York: Schocken, 1965. Reissued without that essay, Chicago: U of Chicago P, 1997.
 "Anmerkungen zu Carl Schmitt, Der Begriff des Politischen". Archiv für Sozialwissenschaft und Sozialpolitik 67, no. 6 (August–September 1932): 732–49.
 "Comments on Carl Schmitt's Begriff des Politischen". (English trans. by Elsa M. Sinclair of "Anmerkungen zu Carl Schmitt", 1932.) 331–51 in Spinoza's Critique of Religion, 1965. Reprinted in Carl Schmitt, The Concept of the Political, ed. and trans. George Schwab. New Brunswick, NJ: Rutgers U Press, 1976.
 "Notes on Carl Schmitt, The Concept of the Political". (English trans. by J. Harvey Lomax of "Anmerkungen zu Carl Schmitt", 1932.) In Heinrich Meier, Carl Schmitt and Leo Strauss: The Hidden Dialogue, trans. J. Harvey Lomax. Chicago: U of Chicago P, 1995. Reprinted in Carl Schmitt, The Concept of the Political, ed. and trans. George Schwab. Chicago: U of Chicago P, 1996, 2007.
 Philosophie und Gesetz: Beiträge zum Verständnis Maimunis und seiner Vorläufer. Berlin: Schocken, 1935.
 Philosophy and Law: Essays Toward the Understanding of Maimonides and His Predecessors. (English trans. by Fred Baumann of Philosophie und Gesetz, 1935.) Philadelphia: Jewish Publication Society, 1987.
 Philosophy and Law: Contributions to the Understanding of Maimonides and His Predecessors. (English trans. with introd. by Eve Adler of Philosophie und Gesetz, 1935.) Albany: SUNY Press, 1995.
 The Political Philosophy of Hobbes: Its Basis and Its Genesis. (English trans. by Elsa M. Sinclair from German manuscript.) Oxford: Clarendon Press, 1936. Reissued with new preface, Chicago: U of Chicago P, 1952.
 Hobbes' politische Wissenschaft in ihrer Genesis. (1935 German original of The Political Philosophy of Hobbes, 1936.) Neuwied am Rhein: Hermann Luchterhand, 1965.
 "The Spirit of Sparta or the Taste of Xenophon". Social Research 6, no. 4 (Winter 1939): 502–36.
 "On German Nihilism" (1999, originally a 1941 lecture), Interpretation 26, no. 3 edited by David Janssens and Daniel Tanguay.
 "Farabi's Plato" American Academy for Jewish Research, Louis Ginzberg Jubilee Volume, 1945. 45 pp.
 "On a New Interpretation of Plato's Political Philosophy". Social Research 13, no. 3 (Fall 1946): 326–67.
 "On the Intention of Rousseau". Social Research 14, no. 4 (Winter 1947): 455–87.
 On Tyranny: An Interpretation of Xenophon's Hiero. Foreword by Alvin Johnson. New York: Political Science Classics, 1948. Reissued Glencoe, Ill.: The Free Press, 1950.
 De la tyrannie. (French trans. of On Tyranny, 1948, with "Restatement on Xenophon's Hiero" and Alexandre Kojève's "Tyranny and Wisdom".) Paris: Librairie Gallimard, 1954.
 On Tyranny. (English edition of De la tyrannie, 1954.) Ithaca: Cornell UP, 1963.
 On Tyranny. (Revised and expanded edition of On Tyranny, 1963.) Includes Strauss–Kojève correspondence. Ed. Victor Gourevitch and Michael S. Roth. New York: The Free Press, 1991.
 "On Collingwood’s Philosophy of History". Review of Metaphysics 5, no. 4 (June 1952): 559–86.
 Persecution and the Art of Writing. Glencoe, Ill.: The Free Press, 1952. Reissued Chicago: U of Chicago P, 1988.
 Natural Right and History. (Based on the 1949 Walgreen lectures.) Chicago: U of Chicago P, 1953. Reprinted with new preface, 1971. .
 "Existentialism" (1956), a public lecture on Martin Heidegger's thought, published in Interpretation, Spring 1995, Vol.22 No. 3: 303–18.
Seminar on Plato's Republic, (1957 Lecture), (1961 Lecture). University of Chicago.
 Thoughts on Machiavelli. Glencoe, Ill.: The Free Press, 1958. Reissued Chicago: U of Chicago P, 1978.
 What Is Political Philosophy? and Other Studies. Glencoe, Ill.: The Free Press, 1959. Reissued Chicago: U of Chicago Press, 1988.
 On Plato's Symposium [1959]. Ed. Seth Benardete. (Edited transcript of 1959 lectures.) Chicago: U of Chicago P, 2001.
 "'Relativism'". 135–57 in Helmut Schoeck and James W. Wiggins, eds., Relativism and the Study of Man. Princeton: D. Van Nostrand, 1961. Partial reprint, 13–26 in The Rebirth of Classical Political Rationalism, 1989.
 History of Political Philosophy. Co-editor with Joseph Cropsey. Chicago: U of Chicago P, 1963 (1st ed.), 1972 (2nd ed.), 1987 (3rd ed.).
 "The Crisis of Our Time", 41–54, and "The Crisis of Political Philosophy", 91–103, in Howard Spaeth, ed., The Predicament of Modern Politics. Detroit: U of Detroit P, 1964.
 "Political Philosophy and the Crisis of Our Time". (Adaptation of the two essays in Howard Spaeth, ed., The Predicament of Modern Politics, 1964.) 217–42 in George J. Graham, Jr., and George W. Carey, eds., The Post-Behavioral Era: Perspectives on Political Science. New York: David McKay, 1972.
 The City and Man. (Based on the 1962 Page-Barbour lectures.) Chicago: Rand McNally, 1964.
 Socrates and Aristophanes. New York: Basic Books, 1966. Reissued Chicago: U of Chicago P, 1980.
 Liberalism Ancient and Modern. New York: Basic Books, 1968. Reissued with foreword by Allan Bloom, 1989. Reissued Chicago: U of Chicago P, 1995.
 Xenophon's Socratic Discourse: An Interpretation of the Oeconomicus. Ithaca: Cornell UP, 1970.
 Note on the Plan of Nietzsche's "Beyond Good & Evil".  St. John's College, 1971.
 Xenophon's Socrates. Ithaca: Cornell UP, 1972.
 The Argument and the Action of Plato's Laws. Chicago: U of Chicago P, 1975.
 Political Philosophy: Six Essays by Leo Strauss. Ed. Hilail Gilden. Indianapolis: Bobbs-Merrill, 1975.
 An Introduction to Political Philosophy: Ten Essays by Leo Strauss. (Expanded version of Political Philosophy: Six Essays by Leo Strauss, 1975.) Ed. Hilail Gilden. Detroit: Wayne State UP, 1989.
 Studies in Platonic Political Philosophy. Introd. by Thomas L. Pangle. Chicago: U of Chicago P, 1983.
 The Rebirth of Classical Political Rationalism: An Introduction to the Thought of Leo Strauss – Essays and Lectures by Leo Strauss. Ed. Thomas L. Pangle. Chicago: U of Chicago P, 1989.
 Faith and Political Philosophy: the Correspondence Between Leo Strauss and Eric Voegelin, 1934–1964. Ed. Peter Emberley and Barry Cooper. Introd. by Thomas L. Pangle. University Park, PA: The Pennsylvania State UP, 1993.
 Hobbes's Critique of Religion and Related Writings. Ed. and trans. Gabriel Bartlett and Svetozar Minkov. Chicago: U of Chicago P, 2011. (Trans. of materials first published in the Gesammelte Schriften, Vol. 3, including an unfinished manuscript by Leo Strauss of a book on Hobbes, written in 1933–1934, and some shorter related writings.)
 Leo Strauss on Moses Mendelssohn. Edited and translated by Martin D. Yaffe. Chicago: University of Chicago Press, 2012. (Annotated translation of ten introductions written by Strauss to a multi-volume critical edition of Mendelssohn's work.)
 "Exoteric Teaching" (Critical Edition by Hannes Kerber). In Reorientation: Leo Strauss in the 1930s. Edited by Martin D. Yaffe and Richard S. Ruderman. New York: Palgrave, 2014, pp. 275–86.
 "Lecture Notes for 'Persecution and the Art of Writing'" (Critical Edition by Hannes Kerber). In Reorientation: Leo Strauss in the 1930s. Edited by Martin D. Yaffe and Richard S. Ruderman. New York: Palgrave, 2014, pp. 293–304.
 Leo Strauss on Nietzsche’s “Thus Spoke Zarathustra”. Edited by Richard L. Velkley. Chicago: University of Chicago Press, 2017.
 Leo Strauss on Political Philosophy: Responding to the Challenge of Positivism and Historicism. Edited by Catherine H. Zuckert. Chicago: University of Chicago Press, 2018.
Leo Strauss on Hegel. Edited by Paul Franco. Chicago: University of Chicago Press, 2019.

 Writings about Maimonides and Jewish philosophy
 Spinoza's Critique of Religion (see above, 1930).
 Philosophy and Law (see above, 1935).
 "Quelques remarques sur la science politique de Maïmonide et de Farabi". Revue des études juives 100 (1936): 1–37.
 "Der Ort der Vorsehungslehre nach der Ansicht Maimunis". Monatschrift für Geschichte und Wissenschaft des Judentums 81 (1936): 448–56.
 "The Literary Character of The Guide for the Perplexed" [1941]. 38–94 in Persecution and the Art of Writing. Chicago: U of Chicago P, 1952.
 [1944] "How to Study Medieval Philosophy" [. Interpretation 23, no. 3 (Spring 1996): 319–338. Previously published, less annotations and fifth paragraph, as "How to Begin to Study Medieval Philosophy" in Pangle (ed.), The Rebirth of Classical Political Rationalism, 1989 (see above).
 [1952]. Modern Judaism 1, no. 1 (May 1981): 17–45. Reprinted Chap. 1 (I–II) in Jewish Philosophy and the Crisis of Modernity, 1997 (see below).
 [1952]. Independent Journal of Philosophy 3 (1979), 111–18. Reprinted Chap. 1 (III) in Jewish Philosophy and the Crisis of Modernity, 1997 (see below).
 "Maimonides' Statement on Political Science". Proceedings of the American Academy for Jewish Research 22 (1953): 115–30.
 [1957]. L'Homme 21, n° 1 (janvier–mars 1981): 5–20. Reprinted Chap. 8 in Jewish Philosophy and the Crisis of Modernity, 1997 (see below).
 "How to Begin to Study The Guide of the Perplexed". In The Guide of the Perplexed, Volume One. Trans. Shlomo Pines. Chicago: U of Chicago P, 1963.
 [1965] "On the Plan of the Guide of the Perplexed" . Harry Austryn Wolfson Jubilee. Volume (Jerusalem: American Academy for Jewish Research), pp. 775–91.
 "Notes on Maimonides' Book of Knowledge". 269–83 in Studies in Mysticism and Religion Presented to G. G. Scholem. Jerusalem: Magnes Press, 1967.
 Jewish Philosophy and the Crisis of Modernity: Essays and Lectures in Modern Jewish Thought. Ed. Kenneth Hart Green. Albany: SUNY P, 1997.
 Leo Strauss on Maimonides: The Complete Writings. Edited by Kenneth Hart Green. Chicago: University of Chicago Press, 2013.

See also 

 American philosophy
 List of American philosophers
 Neoconservatism, often referred as inspired by the work of Strauss
Lev Shestov
Allan Bloom
Seth Benardete
Jacob Klein

Notes

Further reading 
 "A Giving of Accounts". In Jewish Philosophy and the Crisis of Modernity – Essays and Lectures in Modern Jewish Thought. Ed. Kenneth H. Green. Albany: SUNY Press, 1997.
 Altman, William H. F., The German Stranger: Leo Strauss and National Socialism. Lexington Books, 2011
 Andreacchio, Marco. "Philosophy and Religion in Leo Strauss : Critical Review of Menon's Interpretation". Interpretation: A Journal of Political Philosophy 46, no. 2 (Spring 2020): 383–98.
 Benardete, Seth. Encounters and Reflections: Conversations with Seth Benardete. Chicago: U of Chicago P, 2002.
 Bloom, Allan. "Leo Strauss". 235–55 in Giants and Dwarfs: Essays 1960–1990. New York: Simon and Schuster, 1990.
 Bluhm, Harald. Die Ordnung der Ordnung : das politische Philosophieren von Leo Strauss. Berlin: Akademie-Verlag, 2002.
 Brague, Rémi. "Leo Strauss and Maimonides". 93–114 in Leo Strauss's Thought. Ed. Alan Udoff. Boulder: Lynne Reiner, 1991.
 Brittain, Christopher Craig. "Leo Strauss and Resourceful Odysseus: Rhetorical Violence and the Holy Middle". Canadian Review of American Studies 38, no. 1 (2008): 147–63.
 Bruell, Christopher. "A Return to Classical Political Philosophy and the Understanding of the American Founding". Review of Politics 53, no. 1 (Winter 1991): 173–86.
 Chivilò, Giampiero and Menon, Marco (eds). Tirannide e filosofia: Con un saggio di Leo Strauss ed un inedito di Gaston Fessard sj. Venezia: Edizioni Ca' Foscari, 2015. .
 Colen, Jose. Facts and values. London: Plusprint, 2012.
 Deutsch, Kenneth L. and John A. Murley, eds. Leo Strauss, the Straussians, and the American Regime. New York: Rowman & Littlefield, 1999. .
 Drury, Shadia B. Leo Strauss and the American Right. London: Palgrave Macmillan, 1999.
 ———. The Political Ideas of Leo Strauss. New York: St. Martin's Press, 1988.
 Gottfried, Paul. Leo Strauss and the Conservative Movement in America: A Critical Appraisal (Cambridge University Press; 2011)
 Gourevitch, Victor. "Philosophy and Politics I–II". Review of Metaphysics 22, nos. 1–2 (September–December 1968): 58–84, 281–328.
 Green, Kenneth. Jew and Philosopher – The Return to Maimonides in the Jewish Thought of Leo Strauss. Albany: SUNY Press, 1993.
 Havers, Grant N. Leo Strauss and Anglo-American Democracy: A Conservative Critique. DeKalb, IL: Northern Illinois University Press, 2013.
 Holmes, Stephen. The Anatomy of Antiliberalism. Cambridge: Harvard UP, 1996. .
 Howse, Robert. Leo Strauss, Man of Peace, Cambridge University Press, 2014]
 Ivry, Alfred L. "Leo Strauss on Maimonides". 75–91 in Leo Strauss's Thought. Ed. Alan Udoff. Boulder: Lynne Reiner, 1991.
 Janssens, David. Between Athens and Jerusalem. Philosophy, Prophecy, and Politics in Leo Strauss's Early Thought. Albany: SUNY Press, 2008.
 Kartheininger, Markus. "Heterogenität. Politische Philosophie im Frühwerk von Leo Strauss". München: Fink, 2006. .
 Kartheininger, Markus. "Aristokratisierung des Geistes". In: Kartheininger, Markus/ Hutter, Axel (ed.). "Bildung als Mittel und Selbstzweck". Freiburg: Alber, 2009, pp. 157–208. .
 Kerber, Hannes. "Strauss and Schleiermacher. An Introduction to 'Exoteric Teaching". In Reorientation: Leo Strauss in the 1930s. Ed. Yaffe/Ruderman. New York: Palgrave, 2014, pp. 203–14.
 Kerber, Hannes. "Leo Strauss on Exoteric Writing". Interpretation. 46, no. 1 (2019): 3–25.
 Kinzel, Till. Platonische Kulturkritik in Amerika. Studien zu Allan Blooms The Closing of the American Mind. Berlin: Duncker und Humblot, 2002.
 Kochin, Michael S. "Morality, Nature, and Esotericism in Leo Strauss's Persecution and the Art of Writing". Review of Politics 64, no. 2 (Spring 2002): 261–83.
 Lampert, Laurence. Leo Strauss and Nietzsche. Chicago: U of Chicago P, 1996.
 Lutz, Mark J. “Living the Theologico-Political Problem: Leo Strauss on the Common Ground of Philosophy and Theology.” The European Legacy. 2018. Vol. 23. No. 8. pp. 1–25.
 Macpherson, C. B. "Hobbes's Bourgeois Man". In Democratic Theory: Essays in Retrieval. Oxford: Oxford University Press, 1972.
 Major, Rafael (ed.). Leo Strauss's Defense of the Philosophic Life: Reading "What is Political Philosophy?". University of Chicago Press, 2013.  (cloth)
 Marchal, Kai, Shaw, Carl K.Y. Carl Schmitt and Leo Strauss in the Chinese-speaking World: Reorienting the Political. Lanham, Maryland: Lexington Books, 2017. 
 McAllister, Ted V. Revolt Against Modernity: Leo Strauss, Eric Voegelin & the Search for Postliberal Order. Lawrence, KS: UP of Kansas. 1996.
 McWilliams, Wilson Carey. "Leo Strauss and the Dignity of American Political Thought". Review of Politics 60, no. 2 (Spring 1998): 231–46.
 Meier, Heinrich. Carl Schmitt and Leo Strauss: The Hidden Dialogue, Chicago: U of Chicago P, 1995.
 ———. "Editor's Introduction[s]". Gesammelte Schriften. Stuttgart: J. B. Metzler, 1996. 3 vols.
 ———. Leo Strauss and the Theologico-Political Problem. Cambridge: Cambridge UP, 2006.
 ———. How Strauss Became Strauss". 363–82 in Enlightening Revolutions: Essays in Honor of Ralph Lerner. Ed. Svetozar Minkov. Lanham, MD: Lexington Books, 2006.
 Melzer, Arthur. "Esotericism and the Critique of Historicism". American Political Science Review 100 (2006): 279–95.
 Minowitz, Peter. "Machiavellianism Come of Age? Leo Strauss on Modernity and Economics". The Political Science Reviewer 22 (1993): 157–97.
 ———. Straussophobia: Defending Leo Strauss and Straussians against Shadia Drury and Other Accusers. Lanham, MD: Lexington Books, 2009.
 Momigliano, Arnaldo. "Hermeneutics and Classical Political Thought in Leo Strauss", 178–89 in Essays on Ancient and Modern Judaism. Chicago: U of Chicago P, 1994.
 Moyn, Samuel. "From experience to law: Leo Strauss and the Weimar crisis of the philosophy of religion." History of European Ideas 33, (2007): 174–94.
 Neumann, Harry. Liberalism. Durham, NC: Carolina Academic P, 1991.
 Norton, Anne. Leo Strauss and the Politics of American Empire. New Haven & London: Yale UP, 2004.
 Pangle, Thomas L. "The Epistolary Dialogue Between Leo Strauss and Eric Voegelin". Review of Politics 53, no. 1 (Winter 1991): 100–25.
 ———. "Leo Strauss's Perspective on Modern Politics". Perspectives on Political Science 33, no. 4 (Fall 2004): 197–203.
 ———. Leo Strauss: An Introduction to His Thought and Intellectual Legacy. Baltimore: Johns Hopkins UP, 2006.
 Pelluchon, Corine. Leo Strauss and the Crisis of Rationalism: Another Reason, Another Enlightenment, Robert Howse (tr.), SUNY Press, 2014.
 Piccinini, Irene Abigail. Una guida fedele. L'influenza di Hermann Cohen sul pensiero di Leo Strauss. Torino: Trauben, 2007. .
 Rosen, Stanley. "Hermeneutics as Politics". 87–140 in Hermeneutics as Politics, New York: Oxford UP, 1987.
 Sheppard, Eugene R. Leo Strauss and the Politics of Exile: The Making of a Political Philosopher. Waltham, MA: Brandeis UP, 2006. .
 Shorris, Earl. "Ignoble Liars: Leo Strauss, George Bush, and the Philosophy of Mass Deception". Harper's Magazine 308, issue 1849 (June 2004): 65–71.
 Smith, Steven B. Reading Leo Strauss: Politics, Philosophy, Judaism. Chicago: U of Chicago P, 2006. . (Introd: "Why Strauss, Why Now?", online posting, press.uchicago.edu.)
 Smith, Steven B. (editor). The Cambridge Companion to Leo Strauss. Cambridge: Cambridge UP, 2009. .
 Steiner, Stephan: Weimar in Amerika. Leo Strauss' Politische Philosophie, Tübingen: Mohr Siebeck 2013.
 Strong, Tracy B. "Leo Strauss and the Demos," The European Legacy (October, 2012)
 Tanguay, Daniel. Leo Strauss: une biographie intellectuelle. Paris, 2005. .
 Tarcov, Nathan. "On a Certain Critique of 'Straussianism' ". Review of Politics 53, no. 1 (Winter 1991): 3–18.
 ———. "Philosophy and History: Tradition and Interpretation in the Work of Leo Strauss". Polity 16, no. 1 (Autumn 1983): 5–29.
 ——— and Thomas L. Pangle, "Epilogue: Leo Strauss and the History of Political Philosophy". 907–38 in History of Political Philosophy. Ed. Leo Strauss and Joseph Cropsey. 3rd ed. 1963; Chicago and London, U of Chicago P, 1987.
 Tepper, Aryeh. "Progressive Minds, Conservative Politics: Leo Strauss' Later Writings on Maimonides." SUNY: 2013.
 Thompson, Bradley C. (with Yaron Brook). Neoconservatism. An Obituary for an Idea. Boulder/London: Paradigm Publishers, 2010. pp. 55–131. .
 Velkley, Richard. Heidegger, Strauss, and the Premises of Philosophy: On Original Forgetting. University of Chicago Press, 2011.
 West, Thomas G. "Jaffa Versus Mansfield: Does America Have a Constitutional or a "Declaration of Independence" Soul?" Perspectives on Political Science 31, no. 4 (Fall 2002): 35–46.
 Xenos, Nicholas. Cloaked in virtue: Unveiling Leo Strauss and the Rhetoric of American Foreign Policy. New York, Routledge Press, 2008.
 Zuckert, Catherine H. Postmodern Platos. Chicago: U of Chicago P, 1996.
 Zuckert, Catherine H., and Michael Zuckert. The Truth about Leo Strauss. Chicago: U of Chicago P, 2006.

Strauss family 
 Lüders, Joachim and Ariane Wehner. Mittelhessen – eine Heimat für Juden? Das Schicksal der Familie Strauss aus Kirchhain. Marburg: Gymnasium Philippinum, 1989. (In German; English translation: Central Hesse – a Homeland for Jews? The Fate of the Strauss Family from Kirchhain.)

External links

General resources 
 The Leo Strauss Center
 Claremont Institute For the Study of Statesmanship and Political Philosophy – Claremont Institute website. (Includes a search facility.)
 Audio of 1958 lecture by Leo Strauss on Genesis
 Profile at SourceWatch
Guide to the Leo Strauss Papers circa 1930-1997 at the University of Chicago Special Collections Research Center

Scholarly articles, books and parts of books 
 Altman, William H. F. Altruism and the Art of Writing: Plato, Cicero, and Leo Strauss, Humanitas Spring–Fall, 2009
 Batnitzky, Leora. Leo Strauss, The Stanford Encyclopedia of Philosophy (Winter 2010 Edition), Edward N. Zalta (ed.); substantive revision May 24, 2016.
 Brague, Rémi. Athens, Jerusalem, Mecca: Leo Strauss's "Muslim" Understanding of Greek Philosophy, Poetics Today 19.2 (Summer 1998): 235–59.
 Drury, Shadia B. "Leo Strauss and the Neoconservatives". Evatt Foundation, September 11, 2004.
 ———. "The Esoteric Philosophy of Leo Strauss", Political Theory 13, no. 3 (August 1985): 315–337.
 ———. "Leo Strauss and the Grand Inquisitor" . Free Inquiry 24, no. 4 (June 2004).
 ———. "Strauss, Leo (1899–1973)". Routledge Encyclopedia of Philosophy. (New York: Routledge, 1998). Accessed October 5, 2007.
 George, Jim. "Leo Strauss, Neoconservatism and US Foreign Policy: Esoteric Nihilism and the Bush Doctrine". International Politics 42, no. 2 (June 2005): 174–202.
 Gottfried, Paul. "Strauss and the Straussians". Humanitas 18.1&2 (2005): 26–29.
 Levine, Peter. "A 'Right' Nietzschean: Leo Strauss and his Followers". 152–67 in Nietzsche and the Modern Crisis of the Humanities. Albany: SUNY Press, 1995. Inc. notes to chap. 8: 260–65. (Published version of the author's Ph.D. dissertation; online posting on author's personal website, PeterLevine.ws.)
 Novak, David Leo Strauss and Judaism: Jerusalem and Athens Critically Revisited
 Perreau-Saussine, Emile. "Athéisme et politique". Critique n° 728–729 (January–February 2008): 121–35.
 Piccinini, Irene Abigail. "Leo Strauss and Hermann Cohen's "arch-enemy:" a quasi-Cohenian apology of Baruch Spinoza" The Journal of Textual Reasoning 3.1 (June 2004).
 Pippin, Robert B. "The Modern World of Leo Strauss". Political Theory 20.3 (August 1992): 448–72.
 
 Ryn, Claes G. "Leo Strauss and History: The Philosopher As Conspirator". Humanitas 18.1&2 (2005): 31–58.
 Smith, Gregory Bruce. "Leo Strauss and the Straussians: An Anti-Democratic Cult?" Political Science and Politics 30.2 (June 1997): 180–89.
 Tkach, David. "Leo Strauss's Critique of Martin Heidegger." PhD Thesis, University of Ottawa, 2011. http://dx.doi.org/10.20381/ruor-4453
 Verskin, Alan. "Reading Strauss on Maimonides: A New Approach". Journal of Textual Reasoning 3, no. 1 (June 2004).
 West, Thomas G. "Jaffa Versus Mansfield: Does America Have a Constitutional or a 'Declaration of Independence' Soul?" Perspectives on Political Science 31 (September 2002). "Jaffa Versus Mansfield". ("What were the original principles of the American Constitution? Are those principles true?") Online posting. The Claremont Institute, November 29, 2002. Accessed June 1, 2007.
 Xenos, Nicholas. "Leo Strauss and the Rhetoric of the War on Terror". Logos: A Journal of Modern Society and Culture 3.2 (Spring 2004): 1–19. (Printable PDF.)
 Zuckert, Catherine, and Michael Zuckert. "Introduction: Mr. Strauss Goes to Washington?" 1–26 in The Truth about Leo Strauss: Political Philosophy and American Democracy. Chicago: U of Chicago P, 2006. . Online posting of "Excerpt" (1–20), www.press.uchicago.edu. (Book website updated May 21, 2007. Accessed June 1, 2007.)

Related journalistic commentary, other articles and parts of books 
 Ashbrook, Tom, with guests Harvey Mansfield, Shadia B. Drury, and Jack Beatty. "Leo Strauss and the American Right" . On Point. WBUR Radio (Boston, Massachusetts), May 15, 2003. Accessed May 26, 2007. (Interviews. Inc. audio link to radio program.)
 Berkowitz, Peter. What Hath Strauss Wrought?  Weekly Standard, June 2, 2003.
 Clay, Jenny Strauss. The Real Leo Strauss, the New York Times, June 7, 2003
 Hersh, Seymour M. "Selective Intelligence". The New Yorker, May 12, 2003. Accessed June 1, 2007.
 Horton, Scott. "Straussophobia: Six Questions for Peter Minowitz," Harper's Magazine, 9/29/09 
 Smith, Steven B. Hidden Truths: Two Books About the Legacy of Leo Strauss, The New York Times, August 23, 2013.
 Wolin, Richard. "Leo Strauss, Judaism, and Liberalism". The Chronicle of Higher Education, April 14, 2006. Accessed May 22, 2007.

 
1899 births
1973 deaths
20th-century American male writers
20th-century American philosophers
20th-century German philosophers
20th-century German writers
Academics of the University of Cambridge
American historians of philosophy
American Jewish theologians
American male poets
American people of German-Jewish descent
American political philosophers
American political scientists
Columbia University alumni
Commanders Crosses of the Order of Merit of the Federal Republic of Germany
Continental philosophers
Critics of atheism
Epistemologists
German emigrants to the United States
German Jewish theologians
German male poets
German Army personnel of World War I
German scholars of ancient Greek philosophy
Hamilton College (New York) faculty
Historians of political thought
Hobbes scholars
Jewish American social scientists
Jewish American writers
Jewish philosophers
Metaphysicians
The New School faculty
Columbia University faculty
People from Chicago
People from Hesse-Nassau
People from Kirchhain
Philosophers of nihilism
Philosophers of religion
Platonists
Spinoza scholars
St. John's College (Annapolis/Santa Fe) faculty
University of Chicago faculty
University of Hamburg alumni
University of Freiburg alumni
University of Marburg alumni
Writers from Chicago
American male non-fiction writers
Carl Schmitt scholars
Historians from New York (state)
Historians from Illinois
World historians
Scholars of medieval Islamic philosophy
20th-century political scientists